Ian Hanavan (born August 15, 1980) is an American-born Belgian retired basketball player and current coach. He last coached Phoenix Brussels.

Professional career
In October 2007, Hanavan signed with Antwerp Giants.

On August 2, 2013, Hanavan signed with Okapi Aalstar for the 2013–14 season.

On August 23, 2016, the retirement of Hanavan was announced.

Coaching career
In 2018, Hanavan started his coaching career as assistant with the Beijing Ducks in the Chinese Basketball Association (CBA). On March 13, 2020, Hanavan was hired as head coach of Phoenix Brussels for the 2020–21 season.

On October 18, 2021, Hanavan was fired by Brussels after a disappointing 1–3 start in the BNXT League.

Personal
Hanavan received Belgian citizenship in 2009.

Honours

Club
APOEL B.C.
Cypriot Supercup (1): 2011
Okapi Aalstar
Belgian Supercup (1): 2014

Individual
BC Omniworld Almere
DBL All-Star (1): 2004
DBL Statistical Player of the Year (1): 2003–04

References

1980 births
Living people
Almere Pioneers players
American expatriate basketball people in Austria
American expatriate basketball people in Cyprus
American expatriate basketball people in the Czech Republic
American expatriate basketball people in the Netherlands
American men's basketball players
APOEL B.C. players
Basketball coaches from Illinois
Basketball players from Illinois
BBC Aalstar players
Belgian basketball coaches
Belgian men's basketball players
Brussels Basketball coaches
Evansville Purple Aces men's basketball players
Leuven Bears players
Okapi Aalstar players
Power forwards (basketball)
UIC Flames men's basketball players